The 436th Airlift Wing is an active United States Air Force unit.  It is assigned to Air Mobility Command's Eighteenth Air Force, and is based at Dover Air Force Base, Delaware.

Known as the "Eagle Wing", the 436th consists of the operations, maintenance, mission support, and medical groups; in addition to 12 divisions and two detachments. The wing has over 4,000 active-duty military and civilian employees. The wing's Lockheed C-5 Galaxy and Boeing C-17 Globemaster III aircraft provides 25 percent of the nation's inter-theater airlift capability, providing worldwide movement of outsized cargo and personnel on scheduled, special assignment, exercise and contingency airlift missions. The 436th is the only combat-ready C-5 Galaxy wing capable of employing airdrop and special operations tactics in support of worldwide airlift.

The wing routinely flies airlift missions throughout the world projecting global reach to more than 90 countries on six different continents including Asia, Africa, Australia, Europe, North and South America.  Additionally, the Eagle Wing operates the largest and busiest aerial port in the Department of Defense with its passenger terminal moving over 100,000 passengers in 1998.

Units
436th Operations Group
3rd Airlift Squadron C-17
9th Airlift Squadron C-5M
436th Operations Support Squadron

436th Maintenance Group
436th Maintenance Squadron
436th Aircraft Maintenance Squadron (C-5M Galaxy)
736th Aircraft Maintenance Squadron(C-17 Globemaster III)
436th Maintenance Operations Squadron
436th Aerial Port Squadron

436th Mission Support Group
436th Contracting Squadron
436th Security Forces Squadron
436th Force Support Squadron
436th Logistics Readiness Squadron
436th Communications Squadron
436th Civil Engineer Squadron;

436th Medical Group
436th Medical Operations Squadron
436th Aerospace Medicine Squadron
436th Medical Support Squadron

Additionally, the 436th Comptroller Squadron reports directly to the wing.

History
 For related history, see 436th Operations Group

Cold War

The wing was activated as a Reserve troop carrier wing in June 1949, and until April 1951, trained under the supervision of the 2236th Air Force Reserve Training Center, and again during May 1955 – November 1957, under supervision of the 2230th Air Reserve Flying Center. In between, ordered to active service and inactivated almost immediately, personnel serving as fillers for other USAF units during the Korean War.

In January 1966 the 436th was again activated at Dover Air Force Base, Delaware where it replaced the 1607th Air Transport Wing when Military Airlift Command replaced Military Air Transport Service.  The wing initially flew strategic airlift missions with propeller-driven Douglas C-124 Globemaster II and Douglas C-133 Cargomaster aircraft.  However the C-124s were replaced by Lockheed C-141 Starlifter jet transports in the late 1960s, and the C-133s were replaced by the Lockheed C-5 Galaxy in 1971. In 1973, the 436th exchanged their C-141s with the 437th Military Airlift Wing at Charleston Air Force Base, South Carolina, which sent their C-5s to Dover, making the 436th an exclusively C-5 Galaxy wing.

During the Vietnam War, the wing flew numerous missions to Southeast Asia, although the wing flew routes worldwide to Europe, the Middle East, and Africa.  It participated in joint training with U.S. Army, taking part in numerous tactical exercises in the United States and overseas, particularly in support of NATO.  Additionally, it flew worldwide airlift missions, including hauling mail and other high priority cargo, conducting aeromedical evacuation, serving as personnel transport, participating in humanitarian relief, and diplomatic missions.

Wing aircrews were also augmented by attached Reserve aircrews from the 512th Airlift Wing.  It airlifted personnel and equipment for operations in Grenada, 24 October 1983 – 18 December 1983; and Panama, 19 December 1989 – 14 January 1990.  The 436th deployed an Airlift Control Element at Tocumen International Airport, Panama on 19 December 1989.  It also provided airlift of personnel and equipment, and logistical support for operations in Southwest Asia, August 1990 – May 1991.

Modern era
In the years since Desert Storm and Military Airlift Command morphing into Air Mobility Command, the 436th has served as the only combat ready C-5 Galaxy airlift wing capable of airdrop and special operations procedures in support of tactical forces and national objectives.

The wing's 436th Operations Group, is Air Mobility Command's main active-duty heavy-lift organization, flying missions worldwide, and supporting combat operations in Southwest Asia and in Afghanistan.

February 10 2009, the 436AW received its first C-5M Super Galaxy named "The Spirit of Global Reach", the C-5M offers 22% more thrust, 58% higher rate of climb and a modern glass cockpit.

On 26 April 2015, the wing and its associate 512th Airlift Wing dispatched the first USAF aircraft, a Dover C-17, carrying cargo and personnel for humanitarian aid following the earthquake in Nepal.  The plane carried a United States Agency for International Development Disaster Assistance Response Team, the Fairfax County, Virginia Urban Search and Rescue Team and 45 tons of cargo.

Lineage
 Established as the 436th Troop Carrier Wing, Medium on 10 May 1949
 Activated in the reserve on 27 June 1949
 Ordered to active service on 1 April 1951
 Inactivated on 16 April 1951
 Activated in the reserve on 18 May 1955
 Inactivated on 15 May 1958
 Redesignated 436th Military Airlift Wing and activated on 27 December 1965 (not organized)
 Organized on 8 January 1966
 Redesignated 436th Airlift Wing on 1 December 1991

Assignments
 Ninth Air Force, 27 June 1949
 First Air Force, 1 August 1950 – 16 April 1951; 18 May 1955
 First Air Force, 18 May 1955
 Fourteenth Air Force, 25 March-15 May 1958
 Twenty-First Air Force, 8 January 1966
 Eighteenth Air Force, 1 October 2003–present

Components
Groups
 436th Troop Carrier Group (later 436th Operations Group: 27 June 1949 – 16 April 1951; 18 May 1955 – 15 May 1958; 1 December 1991–present

Squadrons
 1st Military Airlift Squadron: 8 January 1966 – 30 June 1971
 3d Military Airlift Squadron: 1 August 1973 – 1 December 1991
 9th Military Airlift Squadron: 8 January 1966 – 8 September 1968; 1 April 1971 – 1 December 1991
 20th Military Airlift Squadron: 8 January 1966 – 1 August 1973
 31st Military Airlift Squadron: 8 January 1966 – 8 April 1969; 1 October 1989 – 1 December 1991
 39th Military Airlift Squadron: 8 January 1966 – 31 March 1971
 52d Military Airlift Squadron: 8 January 1967 – 8 February 1969 (detached)
 58th Military Airlift Squadron: 1 July 1966 – 15 August 1971

Stations
 Godman Air Force Base, Kentucky, 27 June 1949
 Standiford Municipal Airport (later Standiford Field), Kentucky, 20 October 1950 – 16 April 1951
 Floyd Bennett Field (later, NAS New York), New York, 18 May 1955 – 15 May 1958
 Dover Air Force Base, Delaware, 8 January 1966 – present

Aircraft

 Beechcraft C-45 Expeditor, 1949; 1955–1957
 Douglas C-47 Skytrain, 1949–1951
 Curtiss C-46 Commando, 1955–1957
 Fairchild C-119 Flying Boxcar, 1957
 Douglas C-124 Globemaster II, 1966–1969
 Douglas C-133 Cargomaster, 1966–1971
 Lockheed C-141 Starlifter, 1966–1973
 Lockheed C-5 Galaxy, 1971–present
 Boeing C-17 Globemaster III, 2007–present

Expeditions
Operation Just Cause

References

Notes

Bibliography

External links
 Aircraft Serial Number Search
 Dover AFB Home Page

0436
Military units and formations in Delaware